Suissa is a surname. Notable people with the surname include:

Eli Suissa (born 1956), Israeli politician
Justine Suissa (born 1970), British singer-songwriter
Rafael Suissa (born 1935), Israeli politician
Steve Suissa (born 1970), French film director and actor